"Under My Shades" is a song by Swedish singer Zara Larsson taken from her debut extended play, Introducing. Currently, this track is not available outside Scandinavian countries.

Music video
The music video was released on 25 January 2013.

Chart performance
Despite no single release, "Under My Shades" peaked at number 45 in Sweden and spent three weeks on the chart.

Charts

References

2013 songs
2013 singles
Zara Larsson songs
Songs written by Marcus Sepehrmanesh
Songs written by Tommy Tysper